Bahía Portete – Kaurrele National Natural Park (Spanish: PNN Bahía Portete – Kaurrele) is a national natural park in Uribia, La Guajira, Colombia. The northernmost national park of mainland South America is located at the Caribbean coast of the La Guajira peninsula in Bahía Portete,  between Cabo de la Vela and Punta Gallinas. Established on December 20, 2014, it is the most recently designated national park of the country. As of 2017, 59 nationally defined protected areas are incorporated in Colombia. The park hosts a high number of marine and terrestrial species.

Description 

The park is within the boundaries of the municipality Uribia. The climate is hot and arid, due to the desert of La Guajira. The coastal area is characterised by humidity caused by the inland winds.

At the Spanish conquest in the sixteenth century, the bay was known as El Portichuelo, an area where slaves were brought into Colonial Colombia. The sparsely populated area is inhabited by approximately 500 indigenous Wayuu. On April 18, 2004, approximately forty paramilitaries tortured and assassinated six people, four of which were women. They burned various houses and dishonoured their cemeteries. More than 600 Wayuu fled to Venezuela.

Bahía Portete – Kaurrele National Natural Park was designated number 59 of the National Natural Parks of Colombia to protect the marine and littoral ecosystems of the La Guajira peninsula on December 20, 2014. The declaration of the park as a protected area was initiated in 2003. The indigenous communities of the Wayuu, Kamushiwoü, Alijunao, Yariwanischi, Puerto Portete, Ian, Youlepa, Kayuuswaarraaloü and Punta Cosos Espacios contributed in the planning of the establishment of the protected area. At the declaration of the park, president of Colombia Juan Manuel Santos said "Biodiversity is to Colombia, what oil is for the Arabs". Mining and industrial fishing are prohibited.

Biodiversity 

Bahía Portete – Kaurrele Park comprises 25 species of reptiles and amphibians, relatively few mammals and marine fauna of 217 species have been registered in Bahía Portete. The biodiversity of the park is rich in various other species.

Fauna

Flora 
The coastal Bahía Portete Park is richer in flora than the surrounding desert. Common land plants are the cactus Opuntia wentiana and the mangrove tree Avicennia germinans. Meadows of sea grasses of Thalassia testudinum and Syringodium are widely distributed in the marine portion of the park.

Other protected areas in La Guajira 

La Guajira contains eight protected areas, three national and five regional.
 Sierra Nevada de Santa Marta
 Los Flamencos Sanctuary
 Serranía de Macuira
 Manantial de Cañaverales
 Distrito de Manejo Integrado Musichi
 Distrito de Manejo Integrado del Perijá
 Reserva Natural de los Montes de Oca
 Distrito de Manejo Integrado Bañaderos y Alto Camarones

Gallery

See also 

 List of national parks of Colombia

References

Bibliography 
 
 

National parks of Colombia
Nature reserves in Colombia
Geography of La Guajira Department
Protected areas of the Caribbean
Protected areas established in 2014
2014 establishments in Colombia